Georges Pludermacher (born 26 July 1944) is a French classical pianist. He leads an international solo career and performs in the most prestigious festivals.

Biography 
Born in Guéret, Pludermacher began playing the piano at the age of three. He entered the Conservatoire de Paris at eleven and proved to be a brilliant student with his teachers: Lucette Descaves, Jacques Février, Henriette Puig-Roget, Geneviève Joy. He then perfected his skills at the summer courses in Lucerne with Géza Anda. At 19, he left the conservatory with 3 first prizes: piano, chamber music and accompaniment. In 1967, inspired by his interest in contemporary music, he premiered André Boucourechliev's Archipel I and four years later, Iannis Xenakis's Synaphaï. He worked with ensembles such as the Domaine musical and the Ensemble Musique Vivante.

International awards soon followed in the 1960s and 1970s. Pludermacher, who also likes chamber music, performed with Christian Ferras, Nathan Milstein, Ivry Gitlis, Yvonne Loriod, Michel Portal, Christian Ivaldi, Ernst Haefliger, Yuri Bashmet. He also formed a duet with Jean-François Heisser. From 1968, he became solo pianist of the Paris Opera Orchestra. His concert career led him to perform with great conductors, such as Sir Georg Solti and the Chicago Symphony Orchestra, Pierre Boulez and the London Sinfonietta, Christoph von Dohnányi and the Orchestre National de France. He has been invited to festivals in Aix-en-Provence, Avignon, Strasbourg, Salzburg, Montreux, Vienna, Edinburgh, Florence, Barcelona, Madrid, and in 2003 as part of the masterclasses of the Académie française de Musique of Kyoto.

Prizes 
 1968: Laureate of the Vianna da Motta International Music Competition of Lisbon
 1969: Leeds International Piano Competition
 1979: Prize of the Concours Géza Anda in Zurich
 1987: Grand Prix of the Académie Charles-Cros for his recording of the Diabelli Variations
 1995: Grand Prix of the Académie du disque français for the Debussy's Études recording.

Some recordings 
 Debussy's pieces for piano (2003)
 Beethoven's 5 piano concertos, Orchestre de Bretagne, dir. Moshe Atzmon (2004)
 Maurice Ravel's complete work for piano, Flâneries musicales de Reims (2007)
 Beethoven's complete piano sonatas and Diabelli Variations 
 Symphony No. 3 in E flat major Op.55 "Eroica" transcribed for piano by   Franz Liszt (1986)
 Theme from "Love Story" original motion picture soundtrack (1970)

References

External links 
 Georges Pludermacher
 Georges Pludermacher – Schubert revisité (ResMusica)
 Georges Pludermacher (Opera Musica)
 Maurice Ravel par Georges Pludermacher (le piano bleu)
 Pludermacher's discography (Discogs)
 Pludermacher - Beethoven Sonata op.10 no.2 (YouTube)

20th-century French male classical pianists
21st-century French male classical pianists
1944 births
Living people
People from Guéret
Conservatoire de Paris alumni